Proxyfan is a histamine H3 receptor ligand which is a "protean agonist", producing different effects ranging from full agonist, to antagonist, to inverse agonist in different tissues, depending on the level of constitutive activity of the histamine H3 receptor. This gives it a complex activity profile in vivo which has proven useful for scientific research.

References

Ethers
Histamine agonists
Imidazoles